The American Oriental Society was chartered under the laws of Massachusetts on September 7, 1842. It is one of the oldest learned societies in America, and is the oldest devoted to a particular field of scholarship.

The Society encourages basic research in the languages and literatures of the Near East and Asia and covers subjects such as philology, literary criticism, textual criticism, paleography, epigraphy, linguistics, biography, archaeology, and the history of the intellectual and imaginative aspects of Eastern civilizations, especially of philosophy, religion, folklore and art.

It is closely associated with Yale University, which is the site of its library. The society publishes a journal quarterly, the Journal of the American Oriental Society, the most important American serial publication in the historical languages of Asia. Former presidents include Theodore Dwight Woolsey, James Hadley, William Dwight Whitney, Daniel C. Gilman, William H. Ward, Crawford H. Toy, Morris Jastrow, Jr., Harold H. Bender and Ludo Rocher.

References

External links

Asian studies
Ancient Near East organizations
Learned societies of the United States
Organizations established in 1842
1842 establishments in Massachusetts